Balnaguard Halt railway station served the hamlet of Balnaguard, Perth and Kinross, Scotland from 1935 to 1965 on the Inverness and Perth Junction Railway.

History 
The station opened on 2 December 1935 by the London, Midland and Scottish Railway. It closed on 3 May 1965.

References

External links 

Disused railway stations in Perth and Kinross
Railway stations in Great Britain opened in 1935
Railway stations in Great Britain closed in 1965
Beeching closures in Scotland
1935 establishments in Scotland
1965 disestablishments in Scotland
Former London, Midland and Scottish Railway stations